Arthur Barking (November 18, 1891 – May 6, 1949) was a Norwegian actor and scenographer.

Filmography

Actor

 1917: De forældreløse as Store-Jens
 1918: Vor tids helte as Wærn, the chief engineer
 1919: Æresgjesten as Frank
 1920: Kaksen på Øverland as Torgrim as an adult
 1926: Simen Mustrøens besynderlige opplevelser as the bailiff
 1927: Fjeldeventyret as Ole Sørbraaten
 1927: Syv dager for Elisabeth as the hotel concierge
 1932: Fantegutten as Boris, a Gypsy
 1939: Valfångare as Store-Knut
 1943: Den nye lægen as the master builder

Scenographer
 1927: Syv dager for Elisabeth
 1937: Fant

References

External links
 
 Arthur Barking at Filmfront
 Arthur Barking at the Swedish Film Database

1891 births
1949 deaths
20th-century Norwegian male actors
Male actors from Oslo